Forever, Michael is the fourth studio album by American singer Michael Jackson, released by Motown Records on January 16, 1975. The album is credited as having songs with funk and soul material. Eddie Holland, Brian Holland, Hal Davis, Freddie Perren, and Sam Brown III served as producers on Forever, Michael. It is the final album before Jackson's solo breakthrough with his next album, Off the Wall (1979).

Except for the peak position of number 101 on the Billboard Top LPs & Tape chart and number 10 on the Billboard Top Soul Albums chart, both in the United States, Forever, Michael failed to chart in other countries. Unlike Jackson's previous studio albums, the album was not commercially successful worldwide. However, Forever, Michael was generally well received by contemporary music critics. As part of promotion for the album, three singles were released from Forever, Michael, all of which were moderate commercial successes on the US Billboard Hot 100 and other music charts worldwide.

In 1981, Motown released the compilation album, One Day in Your Life, named after the third track off of Forever, Michael, while also releasing the track it was named after as a single, which went to number one in the United Kingdom, becoming the sixth best-selling single of 1981 in the country. Songs from the album were reissued in 2009 after Jackson's death in June of the same year as part of the 3-disc compilation album Hello World: The Motown Solo Collection.

Album information
The album was Jackson's fourth as a solo artist and would end up being his final album released with Motown before he and his brothers, the Jackson 5 (save for Jermaine, who would remain with Motown until 1983) left for CBS Records after the release of their tenth album, Moving Violation. This album displayed a change in musical style for the 16-year-old, who adopted a smoother soul sound that he would continue to develop on his later solo albums for Epic Records, the label he would record on for the rest of his life. The album is also credited as having songs with funk elements.

Most of the tracks were recorded in 1974, and the album was originally set to be released that year. But because of demand from the Jackson 5's huge hit "Dancing Machine", production on Jackson's album was delayed until the hype from that song died down. In 1975, Motown launched a joint promotional campaign with Forever, Michael and Moving Violation.

The album helped return Jackson to the top 40, aided by the singles "We're Almost There" and "Just a Little Bit of You", both written by the Holland Brothers (Eddie and Brian) of Holland–Dozier–Holland.

In 1981, Motown released compilation album of the same name, to capitalize off the success of Jackson's Off the Wall on Epic. The single went to number one in the UK, becoming the 6th best-selling single of 1981 in that country.

This is the only Jackson studio album that does not share a name with one of the songs on the album (not counting the posthumous 2010 album Michael).

Although his voice was already showing signs of changing on his previous album Music & Me two years earlier, this was also the first album to feature Jackson as a tenor rather than a boy soprano.

The compact disc version of the album removes the white border around the photograph of Jackson from the album cover, and instead makes the image larger so that the background cannot be seen. Furthermore, the "Forever, Michael" text is changed to more simple text which lists both "Michael Jackson" and "Forever, Michael" in a different font.

Track listing

Personnel
Adapted from AllMusic.
Michael Jackson – lead and background vocals
David Blumberg - arranger
Jim Britt – photography
Hal Davis – producer
L.T. Horn – engineer, mixing
Eddy Manson – arranger, producer
Freddie Perren – arranger, producer
Sam Brown III – arranger, producer
Russ Terrana – mixing
Arthur G. Wright – arranger

Charts

Sales and certifications

References

External links
 

1975 albums
Albums produced by Hal Davis
Albums produced by the Mizell Brothers
Albums produced by Freddie Perren
Michael Jackson albums
Motown albums
Albums produced by Brian Holland
Albums produced by Edward Holland Jr.